is a four-part Japanese dōjin visual novel series produced by 07th Expansion and playable on Windows PCs. The first game in the series, Season 1, was released on August 11, 2012, and the fourth game, Last Season, was released on December 31, 2013. There have been six manga adaptations based on Rose Guns Days published by Kodansha and Square Enix.

Gameplay

As a visual novel, the gameplay in Rose Guns Days is spent on reading the story's narrative and dialogue. The text is accompanied by character sprites over background art made from altering real-world photographs. Throughout gameplay, the player encounters a quick time event minigame of a fist fight battle sequence that resembles a fighting game. The outcome of these minigames does not influence the progression of the story, and the player even has the option to skip them. The minigame has two parts: attack and defense. After the player successfully attacks three times, the player can then perform an overkill attack whose power is determined by the choice of one of six cards. How well the player performs in the minigames determines the total score and emblems awarded, and as the score increases, so does the player's rank, which increases the difficulty of the minigames.

Development and release
Rose Guns Days is 07th Expansion's fourth visual novel series. The scenario is written entirely by Ryukishi07, who also provides some of the character designs, which are divided between three additional artists: Jirō Suzuki, Sōichirō and Yaeko Ninagawa. The music of Rose Guns Days is provided by various music artists including both professionals and dōjin artists including: Dai, Luck Ganriki, Rokugen Alice, M. Zakky and Pre-holder. The first game in the series, titled Season 1, was released on August 11, 2012 at Comiket 82 and is playable on Windows PCs. Season 2 was released on December 31, 2012 at Comiket 83. Season 3 was released on August 10, 2013 at Comiket 84. The fourth and final game in the series, Last Season, was released on December 31, 2013 at Comiket 85. A version of Season 1 playable on iOS devices was released on November 9, 2012, followed by a version playable on Android devices released on December 13, 2012. All four seasons were also distributed by MangaGamer between February 7, 2014 and April 25, 2015 for explicit use with the English translation patch.

Related media

Manga
A manga adaptation of Rose Guns Days Season 1, illustrated by Sōichirō, was serialized between the September 2012 and March 2014 issues of Square Enix's Gangan Joker magazine. Four tankōbon volumes for Season 1 were released between December 22, 2012 and April 22, 2014. A manga adaptation of Rose Guns Days Season 2, illustrated by Nana Natsunishi, was serialized between the February 2013 and April 2014 issues of Square Enix's GFantasy magazine. Three volumes for Season 2 were released between August 22, 2013 and April 22, 2014. A manga adaptation of Rose Guns Days Season 3, illustrated by Yō Ōmura, began serialization in Square Enix's Gangan Online magazine on September 19, 2013. The first volume for Season 3 was released on April 22, 2014. A manga adaptation of Rose Guns Days Last Season, illustrated by Mitsunori Zaki, began serialization in the May 2014 issue of Square Enix's Big Gangan magazine. Yen Press licensed the manga for release in North America.

A spin-off manga, titled  and illustrated by Yūji Takagi, was serialized in Big Gangan between December 25, 2012 and October 25, 2013. Two volumes for Aishū no Cross Knife were released between August 22 and December 21, 2013. A prologue manga, titled  and illustrated by Mei Renjōji, was serialized between the June 2013 and June 2014 issues of Kodansha's Monthly Shōnen Sirius magazine. The first volume of Fukushū wa Ōgon no Kaori was released on November 8, 2013 and the second and last on July 9, 2014.

Music
Mayumi. A soundtrack titled Rose Guns Days Sound Tracks 1 was released on August 11, 2012, and a soundtrack titled Rose Guns Days Sound Tracks 2 was released on December 30, 2012.

References

External links
Official website 

2012 manga
2013 manga
2012 video games
Action anime and manga
Action video games
Alternate history manga
Alternate history video games
Android (operating system) games
Doujin video games
Gangan Comics manga
IOS games
Japan-exclusive video games
Kodansha manga
Manga based on video games
NScripter games
Ryukishi07
Seinen manga
Shōnen manga
Video games developed in Japan
Visual novels
Windows games
Yen Press titles